Angus Beith (born 22 February 1996) is a Scottish former professional footballer. Beith played as a midfielder for Heart of Midlothian, Stirling Albion, Stenhousemuir, Stranraer and Inverness Caledonian Thistle. Due to a hip injury, Beith was forced to retire aged 23.

Club career

Heart of Midlothian
Beith joined Heart of Midlothian aged 9. He was first included in a matchday squad on 31 August 2013, remaining an unused substitute for their 2–0 defeat away to Inverness Caledonian Thistle in the Scottish Premiership. He featured on the substitutes' bench in 12 more games that season, without entering the field, in a campaign which ended in relegation from the top flight. He made his Hearts debut on 20 August 2014, in the second round of the Scottish Challenge Cup away to Livingston, playing 85 minutes of a 4–1 loss before being replaced by fellow debutant Sean McKirdy.

On 27 November 2014, he was loaned to Scottish League One team Stirling Albion on an emergency loan into early January. The next day, he made his debut for them, playing the entirety of their 0–2 home loss to Raith Rovers in the fourth round of the Scottish Cup. On 6 December, he played his first game in the Scottish Professional Football League, a 2–3 loss to Peterhead at the Forthbank Stadium. The first senior goal of his career came on 27 December, Stirling's third as they went from 3–1 up to lose 3–4 at home to Greenock Morton. His loan was extended, by request to Hearts manager Robbie Neilson, until the conclusion of the season. Beith made 18 league appearances on his loan, with one goal, as the team were relegated to the Scottish League Two.

On 25 March 2016, Beith joined Scottish League One club Stenhousemuir on a 28-day emergency loan, and played five full matches during his month at Ochilview Park. He returned to Stirling on 28 October 2016 on a month's loan, extended to January 2017, and totalled 10 games, all starts. He was sent off on 24 December at the end of a 2–2 draw at Montrose for foul and abusive language.

After returning to Hearts, Beith made his Scottish Premiership debut on 29 January 2017 in a 4–0 loss at league leaders Celtic, replacing Perry Kitchen for the last nine minutes.

Beith was loaned to Stranraer in November 2017. He won the League One player of the month award for January 2018, having scored goals in wins against Raith Rovers, Albion Rovers and Airdrie.

Inverness Caledonian Thistle
In April 2018, Beith agreed to sign a three-year contract with Scottish Championship club Inverness Caledonian Thistle. The deal was completed in May 2018, with Beith moving in exchange for Jake Mulraney.

However, he was forced to retire in early April without playing a game for the club due to a hip injury similar to the one that tennis player Andy Murray had. Beith stated:"I would like to thank John Robertson and Inverness Caledonian Thistle for the opportunity they gave me when I signed last year. I have done everything possible to recover from injury and to get back playing but, reluctantly I have had to accept that it is just not possible for me to play football any longer I wish the club every success this season and in the future"A benefit game on his behalf was agreed on between Hearts and Inverness. The game finished in a 1–1 draw, with Beith being given a guard of honour before kick-off. He later continued a degree course via the Open University and did youth coaching work at Hearts.

International career
Beith represented Scotland at under-19 level.

Career statistics

Personal life
Beith grew up in Buckstone,  Edinburgh and attended Boroughmuir High School.

References

External links
 

1996 births
Living people
Scottish footballers
People educated at Boroughmuir High School
Footballers from Edinburgh
Association football midfielders
Heart of Midlothian F.C. players
Stirling Albion F.C. players
Stenhousemuir F.C. players
Scottish Professional Football League players
Scotland youth international footballers
Stranraer F.C. players
Inverness Caledonian Thistle F.C. players